Wang Ying (born 7 August 1988 in Guangxi) is a female Chinese water polo player who was part of the gold medal winning team at the 2007 National Championship Tournament. She competed at the 2008 and 2012 Summer Olympics.

See also
 China women's Olympic water polo team records and statistics
 List of women's Olympic water polo tournament goalkeepers
 List of World Aquatics Championships medalists in water polo

References

External links
 

1988 births
Living people
Sportspeople from Guangxi
People from Nanning
Chinese female water polo players
Water polo goalkeepers
Olympic water polo players of China
Water polo players at the 2008 Summer Olympics
Water polo players at the 2012 Summer Olympics
Asian Games medalists in water polo
Water polo players at the 2010 Asian Games
Asian Games gold medalists for China
Medalists at the 2010 Asian Games
World Aquatics Championships medalists in water polo
Universiade medalists in water polo
Universiade gold medalists for China
Medalists at the 2009 Summer Universiade
Medalists at the 2011 Summer Universiade
21st-century Chinese women